Heinz Imboden (born 4 January 1962) is a Swiss former racing cyclist. He competed in the individual road race at the 1984 Summer Olympics. He also rode in nine Grand Tours between 1985 and 1996.

References

External links
 

1962 births
Living people
Swiss male cyclists
Olympic cyclists of Switzerland
Cyclists at the 1984 Summer Olympics
Sportspeople from the canton of Bern
Tour de Suisse stage winners